The Georgia Tech Yellow Jackets softball team represents Georgia Institute of Technology in NCAA Division I college softball.  The team participates in the Atlantic Coast Conference. The Yellow Jackets are currently led by head coach Aileen Morales. The team plays its home games at Shirley Clements Mewborn Field located on the university's campus.

History

Coaching history

Championships

Conference Championships

Conference Tournament Championships

Coaching staff

Awards and honors

Conference awards and honors
Sources:

ACC Player of the Year
Laura Williams, 1997
Jen Yee, 2010
Kelsi Weseman, 2011, 2012
Ashley Thomas, 2013

ACC Pitcher of the Year
Jessica Sallinger, 2005

ACC Freshman of the Year
Stephanie Weitman, 1992
Laura Williams, 1994
Anne Knobbe, 1997
Jessica Sallinger, 2002
Aileen Morales, 2005
Whitney Haller, 2006
Kelsi Weseman, 2009
Hope Rush, 2010

References

 
Sports clubs established in 1987
1987 establishments in Georgia (U.S. state)